Senator McCarty may refer to:

Chester E. McCarty (1905–1999), Oregon State Senate
John McCarty (New York) (1782–1851), New York State Senate

See also
Senator McCarthy (disambiguation)